Dark and Cloudy is a 1919 film with Lillian Biron and George Ovey. It is part of the Library of Congress Black Films paper print collection, although it appears to be a comedy short featuring white actors. The film has been described as using blackface as a comic pretext. It was directed and written by Craig Hutchinson.

References

External links
IMDb page

Silent films articles needing an infobox